Deception is a 2004 Canadian-American television film starring Dina Meyer.

Plot
Erin, a struggling actress, has little faith in men. She works for a detective agency, her job is to seduce married men and let their wives catch them in the act. But lately, Erin has been getting threatening phone calls and someone is trying to hurt her.

Cast
Dina Meyer as Erin
Steve Bacic as Max
Gary Hudson as Jack
Anna Silk as Julie 
Alan Fawcett as Barnes
Frank Fontaine as Parker
Rachelle Lefevre as Denise
Jeff Roop as Chet
Cary Lawrence as Dina
Bill Rowat as Dale Williamson
Russell Yuen as a Director
Mark Camacho as Detective Costello

References

External links

2004 films
2000s English-language films
English-language Canadian films
2004 television films
2004 thriller films
American thriller television films
Canadian thriller television films
Films directed by Richard Roy
2000s American films
2000s Canadian films